The discography of American recording artist Chris Rene consists of one independent album, two singles and two music videos.

Albums

Studio albums

Independent albums

Singles

Other songs

As featured artist
"Ain't Goin' Nowhere" - Rich Tycoon (ft. Chris Rene)
"Crazy" / "It's ok" / "Just for Tonight" - Mac Jar monikape  (ft. Chris Rene)
"Dis Shit Knockz" - Fury Figeroa (ft. Ross Rock, Chris Rene & Jesse James)
"Fastlane" / RIP Aziz - Hungry & Hated (ft. Chris Rene)
"Half of What You Got" - Playz (ft. Giant & Chris Rene)
"In 2 Deep" - Famouz (ft. Chris Rene & Cait La Dee)
"The Calm Before the Storm" - Sincere (ft. Chris Rene)
"Who U B?" - Fury Figeroa (ft. Chris Rene)
"Is It So" - Sincere (ft.Chris Rene)
"Worl O Luv" - Super Tough/ Dance Worm (ft. Chris Rene & Rankin' Scroo)
" Hollywood Lyfe" Dylan Synclaire (ft. Chris Rene)

Music videos

References

External links
 

Discographies of American artists
Rhythm and blues discographies
Pop music discographies